The men's 1500 meter at the 2023 KNSB Dutch Single Distance Championships in Heerenveen took place at the Thialf ice skating rink on Saturday 4 February 2023. There were 20 participants. Patrick Roest, Thomas Krol, and Kjeld Nuis qualified for the 2023 ISU World Speed Skating Championships in Heerenveen.

Statistics

Result

 DQ = Disqualified
Referee: Bert Timmermans.  Assistant: Frank Spoel.  Starter: Wim van Biezen 

Source:

Draw

References

Single Distance Championships
2023 Single Distance